The men's 800 metres event  at the 1990 European Athletics Indoor Championships was held in Kelvin Hall on 3 and 4 March.

Medalists

Results

Heats
First 3 from each heat (Q) and the next 3 fastest (q) qualified for the semifinals.

Semifinals
First 2 from each semifinal (Q) and the next 2 fastest (q) qualified for the final.

Final

References

800 metres at the European Athletics Indoor Championships
800